Henrik Rommel (born June 21, 1994) is a Swedish ice hockey player. He is currently playing with IF Troja-Ljungby of the HockeyEttan.

Rommel made his Swedish Hockey League debut playing with AIK IF during the 2013–14 SHL season.

References

External links

1994 births
Living people
AIK IF players
Almtuna IS players
Bofors IK players
Swedish ice hockey centres
IF Troja/Ljungby players
HC Vita Hästen players
Ice hockey people from Stockholm